Troy Evans (born December 3, 1977) is an American football linebacker and special teams.  Evans previously played for the St. Louis Rams, Houston Texans, and New Orleans Saints, winning a Super Bowl ring with the Saints in 2009 against the Indianapolis Colts.

High school career
Born in Bay City, Michigan, Evans moved to Cincinnati, Ohio when he was 11, and attended Lakota High School in West Chester Township, north of Cincinnati, where he won All-State honors in both football and basketball.

College career
Evans was a four-year letterman and two-year starter at outside linebacker for the University of Cincinnati. As a senior, he was a second-team All-Conference USA selection and posted 4.5 sacks and 107 tackles. As a junior, he made 96 tackles.  He graduated from Cincinnati in 2000 with a business finance degree.

Professional career
Signed as an undrafted free agent, Evans played on the practice squad of the 2001-2002 St. Louis Rams, who lost Super Bowl XXXVI to the New England Patriots.

The following year, Evans was signed as free agent by the Texans. He remained with the team until the 2007 season, when he signed a two-year deal with the New Orleans Saints. He has been used as a special teams player during his career.  Evans was selected as Saints special teams captain in 2008 and 2009.  As one of the Saints' team captains, Evans was the player who called the pregame coin toss before the Saints' victory in Super Bowl XLIV.

The Saints released Evans on August 24, 2010.

In June 2011, Evans told his home town school board that he was starting a private school bus service for students who were losing their school service due to budget cuts.

References

External links
 New Orleans Saints bio page

1977 births
Living people
American football linebackers
Cincinnati Bearcats football players
St. Louis Rams players
Houston Texans players
New Orleans Saints players
People from Bay County, Michigan